USS Murphy may refer to the following ships of the United States Navy:

 , was a  launched in 1942 and sold for scrap in 1971. She earned four battle stars, and survived a partial sinking during World War II.
 , is an  launched in 2011 and currently in service

See also
 

United States Navy ship names